Ralph Dain (born 1862; date of death unknown) was an English footballer who played as a defender for Port Vale in the 1880s.

Career
Dain was a right-back in Port Vale's first recorded game, in a 5–1 defeat at nearby Stoke in a Staffordshire Senior Cup second round replay on 9 December 1882. He was also in the sides that won the North Staffordshire Charity Challenge Cup in 1883 and that won the Burslem Challenge Cup and shared the former trophy in 1885. On 13 February 1886 he scored in the FA Cup fifth round replay with Brentwood, which finished 3–3. He remained a first team regular until losing his place in February and most likely departing at the end of the season.

Career statistics
Source:

Honours
Port Vale
North Staffordshire Charity Challenge Cup: 1883, 1885 (shared)
Burslem Challenge Cup: 1885

References

1862 births
Year of death missing
Sportspeople from Burslem
English footballers
Association football defenders
Port Vale F.C. players